The  is the main museum of Sendai, Japan, and is located in the former Third Bailey of Sendai Castle.

The museum displays various artifacts related to the Date clan and the history of Sendai. Date Masamune's famous suit of armor and artifacts related to Hasekura Tsunenaga's visit to Rome are sometimes on display. Other historical artifacts can be seen in various temples and museums in the city, such as the Zuihoden Mausoleum.

See also
List of National Treasures of Japan (historical materials)

External links

Sendai City Museum (Japanese)
Sendai City Museum (English)

City museums in Japan
History museums in Japan
Buildings and structures in Sendai
Museums in Miyagi Prefecture